Surd may refer to:

Mathematics
 Surd (mathematics), an unresolved root or sum of roots
 Radical symbol, the notation for a root
 formerly, an irrational number in general

Other uses
 Surd, Hungary
 Voiceless consonant, opposed to sonant
 Jeremiah Surd, a character on the television series The Real Adventures of Jonny Quest